Isaac Hunsberger House is a historic home located at Limerick Township, Montgomery County, Pennsylvania.  It was built in 1827 and modified in 1893. A rear addition was built in 1926.  It is a -story, "L"-shaped dwelling brick and stone dwelling.  It has a five bay front facade with a one-story porch with Victorian-style decorative elements and is in a vernacular Georgian style.  Also on the property is a contributing bake house / summer kitchen.

The house was added to the National Register of Historic Places in 2000.

The Hunsberger House is now home to the Limerick Township Historical Society.

References

External links
 Limerick Township Historical Society

Houses on the National Register of Historic Places in Pennsylvania
Georgian architecture in Pennsylvania
Houses completed in 1926
Houses in Montgomery County, Pennsylvania
National Register of Historic Places in Montgomery County, Pennsylvania